The following lists events that happened during 1952 in Cape Verde.

Incumbents
 Colonial governor: Carlos Alberto Garcia Alves Roçadas

Events
 The Portuguese colonial administration proposed settling 15,000 people from Cape Verde to the island of São Tomé
Seminary of São José opened in the former Lazareto in Praia

Births
 January 17: Basílio Ramos, politician
 April 17: Jorge Borges, politician and foreign minister
 May 17: Leonel Almeida, singer
 July 14: Nelson Nunes Lobo, painter
 October 2: Vera Duarte, politician

References

 
1952 in the Portuguese Empire
Years of the 20th century in Cape Verde
1950s in Cape Verde
Cape Verde
Cape Verde